Alphitonia excelsa, commonly known as the red ash or soap tree, is a species of tree in the family Rhamnaceae. It is endemic to Australia, being found in New South Wales, Queensland, Northern Territory and the northeastern tip of Western Australia. It is used in bush regeneration as a pioneer species and for amenity planting.

Taxonomy and naming
Alphitonia excelsa was first described by Eduard Fenzl and reclassified by George Bentham. One of 20 species of the genus Alphitonia in Australia and the Pacific Islands, its specific epithet is derived from the Latin excelsus 'tall'. Other common names include Red Almond, Silver Leaf, Leatherjacket, White Leaf, White Myrtle, Sarsaparilla Tree, and Coopers Wood.

Description

The Red Ash has a spreading shade-producing habit when a larger tree with an overall greyish green appearance. The trunk and larger branches bear fissured grey bark, while smaller branches have smoother grey or white bark. When young shoots are bruised, they give off a typical odour of sarsaparilla. The flowers are fragrant in the evening.

Distribution and habitat
It grows in eucalypt forests, eucalypt and acacia savannas, gallery forests and rainforests of NSW from Mount Gulaga (previously known as Mount Dromedary) northwards along the coast and inland to the Pilliga scrub, though Queensland and the Northern Territory and into the northwest of Western Australia. Inland forms can be stunted in appearance. It prefers sandy soils.

Ecology
It serves as a food plant for the caterpillars of the moonlight jewel (Hypochrysops delicia), and the caterpillars of the small green-banded blue (Psychonotis caelius taygetus).

Uses
Trees are quick growing in cultivation. This is an Australian ornamental tree, with some specimens of high visual appeal. It may be used in amenity planting as a street tree providing shelter. It has also been used in boat-building and cabinet making, its tough timber a light red or brown in colour. It can be a fodder plant for sheep and cattle, and is a useful pioneer species in bush regeneration. Indigenous Australians used the leaves as a soap due to the plant’s high saponin content.

References

Cited text

External links

excelsa
Flora of New South Wales
Flora of Queensland
Flora of the Northern Territory
Rosids of Western Australia
Rosales of Australia
Trees of Australia
Ornamental trees